Percy Hugh Boomer (1885 – 29 April 1949) was a professional golfer from the Isle of Jersey who played in the early 20th century. Boomer won three tournaments—the 1923 Belgian Open, the 1924 Swiss Open, and the 1927 Dutch Open. His brother, Aubrey Boomer, was also a professional golfer, as was his son Percy George (known as George). George qualified for the 1950 Open Championship but missed the cut by a single stroke.

Early life
Boomer was born circa 1885 in Islington, London, England. He grew up on the Isle of Jersey where his father was a school teacher in Grouville.

Teacher of golf
He was a well known golf teacher of the early 20th century and wrote one of the most popular instructional books on golf of the era, On Learning Golf, published in 1942. He learned to play golf through the writing of Harry Vardon and Ted Ray.

Boomer was one of the top teachers of golf in Europe and spent the majority of his professional career at St. Cloud Country Club in the Paris suburbs.  He was a proponent of muscle memory in the golf swing and reminded his students to block out negative thoughts in favor of more positive ones in order to play better golf. He was one of the first golf teachers to use stop-action photography.

Boomer endeared himself to his followers when he wrote, "Everything I have ever done in golf, I have had to learn to do [myself]."

Death and legacy
He died on 29 April 1949 in Sunningdale, Berkshire, England. He had been the professional at Sunningdale Golf Club since 1941. Boomer was inducted into the World Golf Teachers Hall of Fame in 1998.

Tournament wins (3)
Note: This list may be incomplete
1923 Belgian Open
1924 Swiss Open
1927 Dutch Open

Results in major championships

Note: Boomer only played in The Open Championship.

NT = no tournament
CUT = missed the half-way cut
WD = withdrew

References

English male golfers
People from Islington (district)
1885 births
1949 deaths